Jay Wesley Osmond (born March 2, 1955) is an American musician.  He is best known for being a member of the Osmond family of performers. He was the drummer for the group although has now retired from performing continues to work in other areas, such as support for the 2022 musical The Osmonds.

Life and career

Jay Wesley Osmond was born in Ogden, Utah, the sixth son of Olive May (née Davis; 1925–2004) and George Virl Osmond (1917–2007). Four of the Osmonds were cast over a seven-year period on NBC's The Andy Williams Show. They also appeared in nine episodes of the 1963-1964 ABC western television series, The Travels of Jaimie McPheeters, with Jay in the role of young Lamentations Kissel. The series starred then 12-year-old Kurt Russell on a wagon train headed to the American West.

In addition to drums, he shared lead vocals on the group's hit "Crazy Horses," a hard rock song that fit Jay's more guttural voice better than usual lead singers Merrill or Donny; he occasionally contributed lead vocals to other tracks, usually ones with a harder-driving sound, such as "One Way Ticket to Anywhere" and "Having a Party." Jay continued with Merrill and Wayne (later joined by Jimmy) as a member of the Osmond Brothers when the group shifted to country music in the 1980s.

 The Osmonds Musical 

Osmond wrote the story to the 2022 musical The Osmonds. It is based on the life and music of The Osmonds musical group and family. 

Personal life
Jay married Kandilyn Harris on August 25, 1987.  They were divorced in 2011.  Together, they have three sons: Jason George (born on September 23, 1988), Eric Clinton (born on January 2, 1991) and Marcus Jay (born on January 8, 1996). Jay's oldest son Jason married Lauren Merrill on March 11, 2011, and they have one son, Grayson George, born 2013, and two daughters, Roslyn Renee born 2015 and Charlotte Dee born 2018.  

Jay married Karen Randall in May 2014. Karen was a fellow divorcee who had never heard of The Osmonds before meeting Jay and eventually became involved in the Osmonds' business enterprises, including the Osmonds musical.  His step-granddaughter London Brise Mortensen (born on October 14, 2006) was accidentally killed on September 18, 2014, at age 7.

Like the rest of his family, Jay Osmond is a member of the Church of Jesus Christ of Latter-day Saints.

Discography

 Studio albums  

 Osmonds (1970)
 Homemade (1971)
 Phase III (1972)
 Crazy Horses (1972)
 The Plan (1973)
 Love Me for a Reason (1974)
 The Proud One (1975)
 Brainstorm (1976)
 Osmond Christmas Album (1976)
 Steppin' Out'' (1979)

References

External links

 

Osmond, Jay
American Latter Day Saints
American male singers
American rock drummers
American rock singers
American country drummers
American country singers
Musicians from Ogden, Utah
Musicians from Los Angeles
People from Branson, Missouri
Living people
The Osmonds members
Osmond family (show business)
20th-century American drummers
American male drummers
Country musicians from California
Country musicians from Missouri
20th-century American male musicians